The 1916 Norwegian Football Cup was the 15th season of the Norwegian annual knockout football tournament. The tournament was open for 1916 local association leagues (kretsserier) champions. Frigg won their second title, having beaten Ørn in the final.

First round

|colspan="3" style="background-color:#97DEFF"|9 September 1916

|-
|colspan="3" style="background-color:#97DEFF"|13 September 1916

|}

Kvik (Fredrikshald) had a walkover.

Second round

|colspan="3" style="background-color:#97DEFF"|17 September 1916

|-
|colspan="3" style="background-color:#97DEFF"|Replay: 29 September 1916

|}

Lyn (Gjøvik) had a walkover.

Semi-finals

|colspan="3" style="background-color:#97DEFF"|3 October 1915

|}

Final

See also
1916 in Norwegian football

References

Norwegian Football Cup seasons
Norway
Football Cup